The 2022 season for  is the 13th season in the team's existence, all of which have been as a UCI WorldTeam. This is the fourth season with Ineos as the title sponsor and the second full season with the current name. They use Pinarello bicycles, Shimano drivetrain, Shimano wheels and Bioracer clothing.

Team roster 

Riders who joined the team for the 2022 season

Riders who left the team during or after the 2021 season

Season victories

National, Continental, and World Champions

Notes

References

External links 

 
 

Ineos Grenadiers
2022
Ineos Grenadiers